Modern Painters (1843–1860) is a five-volume work by the Victorian art critic, John Ruskin, begun when he was 24 years old based on material collected in Switzerland in 1842. Ruskin argues that recent painters emerging from the tradition of the picturesque are superior in the art of landscape to the old masters. The book was primarily written as a defense of the later work of J. M. W. Turner. Ruskin used the book to argue that art should devote itself to the accurate documentation of nature. In Ruskin's view, Turner had developed from early detailed documentation of nature to a later more profound insight into natural forces and atmospheric effects. In this way, Modern Painters reflects "Landscape and Portrait-Painting" (1829) in The Yankee by American art critic John Neal by distinguishing between "things seen by the artist" and "things as they are".

Ruskin added later volumes in subsequent years. Volume two (1846) placed emphasis on symbolism in art, expressed through nature. The second volume was influential on the early development of the Pre-Raphaelite Brotherhood. He produced three more volumes, with the fifth and final volume appearing in 1860.

The fifth volume marked the end of the formational and important part of Ruskin's life in which his father had a great influence.

References

Citations

Sources
Mark Jarzombeck, "Recognizing Ruskin: "Modern Painters" and the Refractions of Self", Assemblage, No. 32 (Apr., 1997), pp. 70–87

External links
 Modern Painters: Volume I, Volume II, Volume III, Volume IV, Volume V at Project Gutenberg
Works of John Ruskin: Modern Painters at Ruskin Library & Research Centre, Lancaster University
 The Works of John Ruskin: Modern Painters, V.1–5 John Wiley and Sons (1890) public domain at Google Books

Art history books
Books by John Ruskin
1843 books
1846 books
Smith, Elder & Co books